Rachel Hetherington (born 23 April 1972) is an Australian professional golfer playing on the American LPGA Tour. Hetherington played under her married name, Rachel Teske, from 2001–04.

Career overview
Hetherington was born in Port Macquarie, Australia. One of the greatest golfers to come out of Australia, she had a very impressive career as an amateur. She was the New South Wales Junior Champion from 1989–92. In 1992, she won the New South Wales Women's Amateur Championship and the Tasmanian Amateur Open.

Hetherington joined the LPGA Tour in 1997, making the cut in 25 of the 28 tournaments she played that year. Her greatest year to date was 2003, when she won twice (earning back-to-back titles for the second time in her career), finished in the top ten 11 times and earned over $900,000 in prize money. She has won 8 tournaments on the LPGA Tour, the last coming in 2003.

Hetherington married former Australian Test cricketer Greg Ritchie in January 2009. Both Hetherington and Ritchie live in Florida, United States. She is active in promoting awareness for breast cancer research.

Professional wins (11)

LPGA Tour wins (8)

LPGA Tour playoff record (4–1)

Ladies European Tour wins (3)
1995 Maredo German Open, La Manga Spanish Open
2001 Evian Masters1

Other wins (1)
2000 Women's World Cup of Golf (with Karrie Webb)

1 Co-sanctioned by LPGA Tour and Ladies European Tour

Results in LPGA majors

^ The Women's British Open replaced the du Maurier Classic as an LPGA major in 2001.

CUT = missed the half-way cut
"T" = tied

Summary
Starts – 48
Wins – 0
2nd-place finishes – 2
3rd-place finishes – 1
Top 3 finishes – 3
Top 5 finishes – 3
Top 10 finishes – 5
Top 25 finishes – 13
Missed cuts – 10
Most consecutive cuts made – 20
Longest streak of top-10s – 2

Team appearances
Amateur
Tasman Cup (representing Australia): 1991, 1993 (winners)

Professional
World Cup (representing Australia): 2005, 2006
The Queens (representing Australia): 2015 (captain), 2016 (captain), 2017

External links

Australian female golfers
ALPG Tour golfers
LPGA Tour golfers
Ladies European Tour golfers
People from the Mid North Coast
Sportswomen from New South Wales
1972 births
Living people